A gubernatorial election was held on 11 April 1999 to elect the Governor of Hokkaido Prefecture.

Candidates
Tatsuya Hori - incumbent governor of Hokkaido, age 63.
 - member of the House of Representatives, age 55.
 - Secretary General of the Hokkaido National Medical Association, age 50.

Results

References

Hokkaido gubernational elections
1999 elections in Japan